Tancred and Sigismunda is a 1745 tragedy by the British writer James Thomson. It is inspired by one of the story's from Giovanni Boccaccio's The Decameron.

The original cast included David Garrick as Tancred, Thomas Sheridan as Siffredi, Dennis Delane as Osmond, William Havard as Rodolpho and Susannah Arne as Sigismunda.

References

Bibliography
 Baines, Paul & Ferarro, Julian & Rogers, Pat. The Wiley-Blackwell Encyclopedia of Eighteenth-Century Writers and Writing, 1660-1789. Wiley-Blackwell, 2011.
 Nicoll, Allardyce. A History of Early Eighteenth Century Drama: 1700-1750. CUP Archive, 1927.
 Wilson, Brett D. A Race of Female Patriots: Women and Public Spirit on the British Stage, 1688-1745. Lexington Books, 2012.

1745 plays
Tragedy plays
West End plays
Plays by James Thomson
Plays based on works by Giovanni Boccaccio
Plays set in Italy